Primera División de México (Mexican First Division) Clausura 2008 was a Mexican football tournament - the second of two  tournaments held in the 2007-08 season. It began January 18, 2008 and ran until June 1, 2008. Veracruz and Morelia inaugurated the season, with Morelia winning 1–0. Reigning champions Atlante F.C. were eliminated from making the Liguilla with a 3-2 loss to Monterrey and thus could not defend their title, and Veracruz was relegated to the Primera División A after finishing last on the percentage table. Six teams qualified directly to the Liguilla (playoffs) by finishing in the top two of their respective groups, and these are the teams of Toluca, Jaguares, Santos Laguna, Monterrey, Guadalajara, and Cruz Azul. Four teams advanced to what is known as the Repechaje (playoff qualifiers), and these are being San Luis, Pachuca, Necaxa, and Atlas. 

On June 1, 2008 Santos Laguna beat Cruz Azul on 3-2 aggregate to win the Clausura 2008 trophy. This was the club's third championship victory.

Overview

Final standings (Groups)

Last updated May 4, 2008

League table

Top goalscorers 
Players sorted first by goals scored, then by last name. Only regular season goals listed.

Source: MedioTiempo

Playoffs

Repechage

2–2 on aggregate. San Luis advanced for being the higher seeded team.

1–1 on aggregate. Necaxa advanced for being the higher seeded team.

Bracket

Quarterfinals

2–2 on aggregate. Cruz Azul advanced for being the higher seeded team.

Monterrey won 8–5 on aggregate.

2–2 on aggregate. San Luis advanced for being the higher seeded team.

Santos Laguna won 3–2 on aggregate.

Semifinals

Cruz Azul won 2–1 on aggregate.

3–3 on aggregate. Santos Laguna advanced for being the higher seeded team.

Finals

Santos Laguna won 3–2 on aggregate.

By winning Clausura 2008, Santos earned a berth in the 2008–09 CONCACAF Champions League Group Stage.

By being the Clausura 2008 runner-up, Cruz Azul earned a berth in the 2008–09 CONCACAF Champions League Preliminary Round.

Relegation table

External links
 MedioTiempo.com (where information was obtained)

Mexico
Clausura